Li, li, or LI may refer to:

Businesses and organizations
 Landscape Institute, a British professional body for landscape architects
 Leadership Institute, a non-profit organization located in Arlington, Virginia, US, that teaches "political technology."
 Li Auto (Nasdaq: LI), a Chinese manufacturer of electric vehicles
 Liberal International, a political federation for liberal parties
 Linux International, an international non-profit organization
 Lyndon Institute, an independent high school in the U.S. state of Vermont
 The Light Infantry, a British Army infantry regiment

Names
 Li (surname), including:
 List of people with surname Li
 Li (surname 李), one of the most common surnames in the world
 Li (surname 黎), the 84th most common surname in China
 Li (surname 栗), the 249th most common surname in China
 Li (surname 利), the 299th most common surname in China
 Li (surname 厉), a Chinese surname
 Li (surname 郦), a Chinese surname
 Li (surname 理), a rare Chinese surname
 Li (surname 莉), a rare surname of the Hui people
 Li Andersson (born 1987), Finnish politician
 Li Kochman (born 1995), Israeli judoka

Places
 Amphoe Li, a district in Lamphun Province, northern Thailand
 Liechtenstein, ISO country code
 Li, Lamphun, Thailand, a village and subdistrict of Thailand
 Li, Norway, a village in Norway
 Li County (disambiguation), several counties in China
 Li River (disambiguation), rivers in China and Thailand
 Long Island, New York

Science and technology
 Li, the polylogarithm function
 Li, the logarithmic integral function
 , indicating an item in an HTML list; see HTML element#li
 954 Li, an asteroid
 Lifted index, meteorological term for temperature differential
 Lithium, symbol Li, a chemical element

Other uses
 51 (number), LI in Roman numerals
 Li (Confucian),, a concept of ritual in Confucian philosophy
 Li (Neo-Confucianism),, a philosophical concept
 Li (unit) (里), a Chinese unit of length
 Li or cash (unit), a Chinese unit of weight
 Li (Subdivision) (里), the basic level administrative subdivisions of the Republic of China
 Li people (黎族), an ethnic group of China
 Li language, or Hlai
 Limburgish language (ISO 639-1 language code li)
 Li, an alien character in the 2011 first-person shooter video game Conduit 2
 Lawful interception, selective wiretapping of telecommunications by law enforcement agencies

See also 
 Lee (disambiguation)